Starfield is the first major label album by the Christian music band Starfield. It was released on May 18, 2004, by Sparrow Records.

Track listing 

 "Filled with Your Glory (Prelude)"
 "Filled with Your Glory"
 "Love Break Me"
 "Revolution"
 "Alive in This Moment"
 "Tumbling After"
 "Outstretched Hands"
 "Ordinary Life"
 "Over My Head"
 "Can I Stay Here Forever?"
 "All for You"
 "Cry in My Heart"

Personnel 

 Jon Neufeld - electric guitar, background vocals
 Shaun Huberts
 Tim Neufeld - vocals, acoustic guitar
 John Andrews
 Matt Bronleewe

References 

2004 albums
Starfield (band) albums
Sparrow Records albums